The Mayor of the Rajshahi City is the chief executive of the Rajshahi City Corporation. The Mayor's office administers all city services, public property, most public agencies, and enforces all city and state laws within Rajshahi city.

The Mayor's office is located in Nagar Bhaban; it has jurisdiction over all 30 wards of Rajshahi City.

Mayor and administrator list
Former Rajshahi City Corporation mayor and administrator's list:

Elections

Election Result 2018

Election Result 2013

References

Mayors of Rajshahi